Caiti Baker is an Australian Singer, Songwriter, Producer, Harmony Arranger, Vocal Engineer, Music Workshop Facilitator, Mentor.

Early life
Baker's home is Darwin on stunning Larrakia land in the Northern Territory. Caiti's father, is a blues musician himself and Baker was raised on gospel, jazz, big band, rock & roll, blues and soul music and developed a love for R&B and hip hop in her adolescence.

At the age of 12, Baker was given an 8 track digital recorder and she learnt how to write and record songs. Baker says she was inspired by the  like Aretha Franklin, Big Mamma Thornton, Billie Holiday, Nina Simone, Etta James and Little Walter.

Music

2009-2014: Sietta
From 2009, Baker and James Managohig (AKA Kuya James) formed the duo Sietta. Sietta released two studio albums, two extended plays, touring nationally and internationally before splitting in 2014.

2015-2019: Solo work and Zinc 
In 2015, Baker signed to Perambulator Records in Darwin. In mid-2015, Baker toured with and supported Dr. G Yunupingu on his The Gospel Album Tour.

In 2016, Baker featured the A.B. Original track "Dead in a Minute" before releasing her debut single "Heavy On My Heart" in August 2016.

Baker released her debut studio album Zinc in October 2017 which received 4 Star reviews from Rolling Stone, The Music and the Weekend Australian. Zinc was Album of the Week on Double J and ABC Darwin and came in at number 44 in Double J's Top 50 Albums of 2017. In that same year, Baker was awarded Northern Territory Best Live Voice of the Year at the National Live Music Awards and performed at festivals, BIGSOUND and Womadelaide

2018 saw Baker continue her national tour which culminated with the release of the B6 project, a collection of songs that serve as an accompaniment to her debut album Zinc. The 3-track EP titled B6 was digitally released, featuring songs left over from Zinc. The AIR Awards ceremony in that same year, included performances from BAD//DREEMS, Baker Boy, Alex the Astronaut, Fanny Lumsden, Stella Donnelly and Caiti Baker.

The NT Song of the Year in the Blues and Roots category was awarded to Baker in 2018 with ‘I Won't Sleep' by Caiti Baker, Greg Baker, James Mangohig, Michael Hohnen  Caiti was awarded Best Live Voice of the NT in the National Live Music Awards (NMLAs).

Baker released an AIR Award-winning 2019 EP, Dust (Part 1)  and performed at Bluesfest in the same year, she said of Bluesfest, "I kinda grew up at that festival."

2020 
The single, Worth It, was released on 8 March 2020, International Women's Day, and was the title track to the podcast Birds Eye View recorded in collaboration with women in the Darwin Correctional Centre, shining a unique light inside the prison walls. The podcast went on to win the award for best Australian podcast of the year at The Australian Podcast Awards 2020.

Produced a live collective show called “The Settle Down Sisters” (6 artists) which was performed at the Darwin Entertainment Centre and supported Jimmy Barnes. The Settle Down Sisters is a collective of women from a diverse range of backgrounds in the NT coming together with the common thread of voice, empowerment, laughter, and food.

On 19 June 2020, Baker released Mary of the North. Baker dedicated the album to the Northern Territory and its unique characters. The album was produced by James Managohig and featured the single "Carry", a re-recording of the Sietta track  "Carry You". Baker said of the album she, "was inspired by the amazing humans that make up my community here in the NT, I want listeners to hear the textures, colours and tones that make this place the incredibly unique and interesting home that it is to many."

Despite so many live performances being cancelled in the year 2020 including Baker's national tour with George Benson, Caiti performed a once only set (twice) with guest musicians from Perth and longtime collaborator, James Mangohig at Nannup Music Festival in February.

Caiti was an Artist-in-Residence on ABC Radio's, Double J,

In September, Kuya James’ released an 80s inspired music video entitled Rewind Our Love featuring Caiti Baker & Serina Pech.

Dust (Part 1) wins Best Independent Soul/R&B Album or EP Release in the AIR Awards

Not only did Baker feature on, she produced, vocal engineered and featured on Wirrimu with Manuel Dhurrkay and Buddy’s Lullaby with Noni Eather as part of the ABC's children's album, “The Moon, The Mouse & The Frog: Lullabies From Northern Australia.”

2021 
At the end off January 2021, Baker released She’s Cruel (Acoustic Version) [feat. Ben Edgar]

The month of May saw Caiti travel interstate for her first post-pandemic performance at the iconic Goldcoast festival, Blues on Broadbeach.

Worth it makes number 10 in the Territory Sounds Countdown 2021  and Baker is donating some of the royalties "to the Women of Worth initiative, helping prisoners and ex-prisoners in the community."

As part of the Darwin International Film Festival, Caiti Baker's music video for Gone, which was Directed in 2019 by Claudia Sangiorgi Dalimore was awarded Best Music Video in the 3rd Capricornia Film Awards.

Discography

Albums

Extended plays

Singles

As lead artist

As featured artist

Awards and nominations

AIR Awards
The Australian Independent Record Awards (commonly known informally as AIR Awards) is an annual awards night to recognise, promote and celebrate the success of Australia's Independent Music sector.

|-
| AIR Awards of 2018
| Zinc
| Best Independent Blues and Roots Album
| 
|-
| AIR Awards of 2020
| The Dust (Pt. 1)
| Best Independent Soul/R&B Album or EP
|

ARIA Music Awards
The ARIA Music Awards is an annual awards ceremony that recognises excellence, innovation, and achievement across all genres of Australian music.

|-
| ARIA Music Awards of 2018
| Caiti Baker for Gurrumul – Djarimirri (Child of the Rainbow)
| ARIA Award for Best Cover Art
| 
|-

National Indigenous Music Awards
The National Indigenous Music Awards (NIMA) is an annual award ceremony and recognises excellence, dedication, innovation and outstanding contribution to the Northern Territory music industry.

|-
| National Indigenous Music Awards 2016
| "Dead in a Minute" (A.B. Original featuring Caiti Baker)
| Song of the Year
| 
|-

National Live Music Awards
The National Live Music Awards (NLMAs) are a broad recognition of Australia's diverse live industry, celebrating the success of the Australian live scene. The awards commenced in 2016.

|-
| rowspan="2" | National Live Music Awards of 2017
| rowspan="2" | Caiti Baker
| Live R&B or Soul Act of the Year
| 
|-
| Northern Territory Live Voice of the Year 
| 
|-
| rowspan="3" | National Live Music Awards of 2018
| rowspan="3" | Caiti Baker
| Live Voice of the Year
| 
|-
| Live R&B or Soul Act of the Year
| 
|-
| Northern Territory Live Voice of the Year 
| 
|-
| National Live Music Awards of 2019
| Caiti Baker
| Live R&B or Soul Act of the Year
| 
|-
| National Live Music Awards of 2020
| Caiti Baker
| Northern Territory Live Act of the Year
| 
|-

References

Indigenous Australian musicians
Living people
ARIA Award winners
Year of birth missing (living people)
Australian women singer-songwriters